Leif Mathias Sörvik (28 August 1889 – 13 October 1963) was a Swedish rower who competed in the 1912 Summer Olympics. He was the strokeman of the Swedish boat Göteborgs which was eliminated in the first round of the men's eight tournament. His brothers Birger and Haakon were Olympic gymnasts.

References

1889 births
1963 deaths
Swedish male rowers
Olympic rowers of Sweden
Rowers at the 1912 Summer Olympics
People from Trollhättan
Sportspeople from Västra Götaland County